Nam Pin Wai, sometimes transliterated as Nam Bin Wai, is a walled village in the Yuen Long Kau Hui area of Yuen Long District, Hong Kong.

Administration
Nam Pin Wai is a recognized village under the New Territories Small House Policy.

History
Nam Pin Wai and nearby Sai Pin Wai were set up by members of the Tang Clan of Kam Tin. The Tang later considered that the two villages were of bad feng shui and moved to nearby Ying Lung Wai.

At the time of the 1911 census, the population of Nam Pin Wai was 519. The number of males was 223.

Nam Pin Wai is part of the Tung Tau alliance or "Joint Meeting Group of Seven Villages", together with Tung Tau Tsuen, Choi Uk Tsuen, Ying Lung Wai, Shan Pui Tsuen, Wong Uk Tsuen and Tai Wai Tsuen. The Yi Shing Temple in Wong Uk Tsuen is an alliance temple of the Tung Tau Alliance.

Features
The Tai Wong Temple in Cheung Shing Street is the main temple of Nam Pin Wai as well as Yuen Long Kau Hui.

See also
 Walled villages of Hong Kong
 2019 Yuen Long attack

References

External links

 Delineation of area of existing village Nam Bin Wai (Shap Pat Heung) for election of resident representative (2019 to 2022)

Walled villages of Hong Kong
Yuen Long
Shap Pat Heung
Villages in Yuen Long District, Hong Kong